E3 SUMO-protein ligase PIAS1 is an enzyme that in humans is encoded by the PIAS1 gene.

Function 

This gene encodes a member of the mammalian PIAS [protein inhibitor of activated STAT-1 (signal transducer and activator of transcription-1)] family. This member contains a putative zinc-binding motif and a highly acidic region. It inhibits STAT1-mediated gene activation and the DNA binding activity, binds to Gu protein/RNA helicase II/DEAD box polypeptide 21, and interacts with androgen receptor (AR). It functions in testis as a nuclear receptor transcriptional coregulator and may have a role in AR initiation and maintenance of spermatogenesis.

Interactions 

PIAS1 has been shown to interact with:
 DNMT3A, 
 P53,
 STAT1, 
 Small ubiquitin-related modifier 1, 
 Sp3 transcription factor,  and
 UBE2I.

References

Further reading